Asarwa is one of the 182 Legislative Assembly constituencies of Gujarat state in India. It is part of Ahmedabad district and is reserved for candidates belonging to the Scheduled Castes.

List of segments
This assembly seat represents the following segments,

 Ahmedabad City Taluka (Part) – Ahmedabad Municipal Corporation (Part) Ward No. – 17, 18, 19, 20, Asarva (OG) Ward No. – 44. With Dudheshwar Ward including Shahibaugh up to Delhi Chakla.

Members of Legislative Assembly

Election results

2022

2017

2012

2007

2002

See also
 List of constituencies of the Gujarat Legislative Assembly
 Ahmedabad district

References

External links
 

Assembly constituencies of Gujarat
Ahmedabad district